Sri Satchidanandendra Saraswati Swamiji (5 January 1880 – 5 August 1975) was monk-scholar in the Shankara Advaita tradition. He is the founder of the Adhyatma Prakasha Karyalaya in Holenarasipura, Hassan district, Karnataka, India. He was a great Vedantin of Advaitha Philosophy.

Life
Swami Satchidanandendra Saraswati (1880-1975) is one of the greatest exponents of traditional Advaita Vedanta in modern times. Born as Sri Yellambalase Subbarao, he worked as a school teacher in the Indian state of Karnataka. He gave many lectures and wrote many articles on the Vedanta in English, Kannada and Sanskrit. His books, articles and lectures have made an important impact on disciples, pandits, sadhus and also scholars in the field of classical Indian philosophy. Satchidanandendra Swamiji authored some 200 works, and he dedicated his life to teaching about the pristine pure Advaita Vedanta philosophy of Shankara.

Satchidanandendra Saraswati was a philosopher who dedicated all his life for the Vedanta sadhana and attained Brahma-jnana. He was known as a Jivanmukta sage. He was the best example of a Sanskrit saying, "One should spend one's life until sleep and until death only in Vedantic contemplation".

Having grown up in an orthodox South Indian Brahmin family, young Y. Subbaraya Sharma (as was his name prior to sannyasa) became attached to Vedanta and Hindu philosophy. In 1910 he was initiated into the study of Shankara's scriptures by the Jagadguru Shankaracharya of Sringeri Peetham. He learnt Vedanta from Virupaksha Shastri (the guru of Swami Chandrasekhara Bharati) and K.A. Krishnaswamy Iyer.  Swami Satchidanandendra Saraswati soon became well known for having shown that the later Vedantic tradition had in fact deviated from the teachings of the classical acharyas Gaudapada, Shankara and Sureshvara. This led to many fascinating discussions with learned pandits. In 1920 he founded the organisation Adhyatma Prakasha Karyalaya, which is still very active today. He was initiated into sannyasa in 1948. As a sannyasi, Satchidanandendra Swamiji lived a very simple and secluded life at his small ashram in Holenarsipur.

Teachings
According to Satchidanandendra Saraswati, Shankara employed a method called Adhyaropa Apavada, in which a property is imposed (adhyaropa) on Atman to convince one of its existence, whereafter the imposition is removed (apavada) to reveal the true nature of Atman as nondual and undefinable. For example, Atman, the real "I," is described as witness, giving "it"  an attribute to separate it from non-self. Since this implies a duality between observer and observed, next the notion of "witness" is dropped, by showing that the Self cannot be seen and is beyond qualifications, and only that what is remains, without using any words:

Literary works of Satchidanandendra Saraswati

Books written in English
 Adhyatma Yoga
 Avasthatraya or The Unique Method of Vedanta
 Collected Works of K. A. Krishnaswamy Iyer
 Essays on Vedanta
 How to Recognize the Method of Vedānta
 Introductions (to vedānta texts)
 Intuition of Reality
 ĪS'āvāsyōpanishad (with the commentary of Sri S'ankaracharya)
 Misconceptions About Śaṅkara
 S'ankara's Sutra-Bhashya (Self-Explained)
 S'uddha-S'āṅkara-Prakriyā-Bhāskara
 Salient Features of Śaṅkara's Vedānta
 Śaṅkara's Clarification of Certain Vedȧntic Concepts
 The Basic Tenets of Śāṅkara Vedānta
 The Method of the Vedanta. A Critical Account of the Advaita Tradition (1989–1997)
 The Heart of Sri Samkara
 The Pristine Pure Advaita Philosophy of Ādi Śaṅkara (Śaṅkara Siddhānta)
 The Reality Beyond All Empirical Dealings
 The Science of Being 
 The Unique Teaching of Shankara
 The Upanishadic Approach to Reality
 The Vision of Ātman

The Method of the Vedanta
In The Method of the Vedanta. A Critical Account of the Advaita Tradition (1989–1997), Satchidanandendra Saraswati gives a critical account of the Advaita tradition. Satchidanandendra Saraswati argues that most of post-Shankara Advaita vedanta actually deviates from Shankara, and that only his student Suresvara, who's had little influence, represents Shankara correctly. In this view, Shankara's influential student Padmapada misunderstood Shankara, while his views were manitained by the Suresvara school. According to Satchidanandendra Sarasvati, "almost all the later Advaitins were influenced by Mandana Misra and Bhaskara."

Notes

References

Sources
Printed sources

 
 

Web-sources

External links 
 Adhyatmaprakasha Karyalaya website
 Adhyaropa Apavada, 
 Indian Classical Music Online Radio Station, Sri Sri Satchidanandendra Saraswathi

People from Hassan district
20th-century Hindu religious leaders
20th-century Hindu philosophers and theologians
1880 births
1975 deaths
Advaita Vedanta